The Baptist Church in Exeter, also known as Chestnut Hill Baptist Church, is a historic building located in Exeter, Rhode Island.

The church building was constructed in 1838  in a Greek Revival style. The church was added to the National Register of Historic Places on November 21, 1978. Mercy Brown, an alleged vampire, was buried in the Chestnut Hill Baptist Church cemetery in 1892 and later exhumed.

See also
National Register of Historic Places listings in Washington County, Rhode Island

References

External links
 Chestnut Hill Baptist Church home page

Baptist churches in Rhode Island
Churches in Washington County, Rhode Island
Cemeteries in Rhode Island
Exeter, Rhode Island
Churches completed in 1838
19th-century Methodist church buildings in the United States
Churches on the National Register of Historic Places in Rhode Island
Greek Revival church buildings in Rhode Island
National Register of Historic Places in Washington County, Rhode Island